Tycho Brahé is the second studio album by Lightwave, released in 1993 by Crystal Lake.

Track listing

Personnel 
Adapted from the Tycho Brahé liner notes.

Lightwave
 Christoph Harbonnier – synthesizer
 Christian Wittman – synthesizer
Additional musicians
 Jacques Derégnaucourt – violin (1, 3, 9)
 Paul Haslinger – synthesizer (2, 3, 8, 9)
 Renaud Pion – clarinet (10)
 Hector Zazou – synthesizer (10)

Production and additional personnel
 Serge Leroy – mixing, recording
 Lightwave – production, mixing, recording
 MicroCosmos – illustrations, design
 Bob Olhsson – mastering
 Andreas Pfeiffer – illustrations, design

Release history

References

External links 
 

1993 albums
Lightwave (band) albums